Municipal Golf Course, also known as Buncombe County Golf Course, is a historic golf course and national historic district located at Asheville, Buncombe County, North Carolina.  The district encompasses one contributing building (the Clubhouse (1927)) and one contributing site associated with a course designed by Donald Ross and opened in 1927.  The Municipal Golf Course was the first municipal course in North Carolina to be racially integrated.

It was listed on the National Register of Historic Places in 2005.

References

African-American history of North Carolina
Sports venues on the National Register of Historic Places in North Carolina
Historic districts on the National Register of Historic Places in North Carolina
Buildings and structures in Asheville, North Carolina
National Register of Historic Places in Buncombe County, North Carolina
Golf clubs and courses on the National Register of Historic Places